New England Botanic Garden at Tower Hill is a 171-acre botanic garden and arboretum located in Boylston, Massachusetts, approximately  north of central Worcester in Worcester County, Massachusetts. The Garden features 18 distinct gardens, preserved woodlands, and miles of walking trails.

It was founded in 1986 on the former Tower Hill Farm by the Worcester County Horticultural Society,  which maintains its headquarters here and is the third oldest horticultural society in the U.S.

The mission of New England Botanic Garden at Tower Hill is to: "Create experiences with plants that inspire people and improve the world." This mission is enhanced by six organizational values: Learning, Stewardship, Sustainability, Inclusivity, Joy, and Excellence.

Features

The Stoddard Education and Visitors Center — the hub for visitor activities at New England Botanic Garden at Tower Hill. The complex houses: Farmer & The Fork Cafe; Garden Shop; a 100-seat theater; four classrooms and conference space; and the Library with horticulture, gardening, and botany books, magazines, DVDs, and archival materials.

Collections and gardens
New England Botanic Garden at Tower Hill has a variety of themed specialty gardens and focused plant collections, they include: 
 The Entry Garden —  an introductory garden with vibrant displays of annuals and tender plants with the permanent collection of ornamental, edible and native plants. It uses the E. Stanley and Alice M. Wright Entry Garden and the Thomas Smith W. Robert Mill Entry Court to introduce visitors to the botanic garden beyond the Stoddard Education and Visitors Center at its terminus.
 The Winter Garden — a  courtyard garden enclosed on three sides by the Stoddard Education and Visitors Center, the Orangerie, and the Limonaia. It features plants especially known for their winter attributes, and the formal Domitian’s Pool centered in the courtyard has twin bronze sculptures of native Eastern Box Turtles as fountain jets.
 The Orangerie — a 4,000 square foot (370 m2) orangerie greenhouse, a hybrid of an 18th-century Neoclassical orangerie and a modern conservatory. It is Tower Hill's primary climate controlled wintertime display facility, featuring hundreds of sub-tropical plants and blooming bulbs.
 The Limonaia — a conservatory greenhouse displaying a portion of THBG's collection of non-hardy plants that need to winter in a sub-tropical environment, including potted lemon trees.
 The Cottage Garden — the first garden designed and planted at THBG in the 1980s. It emphasizes color combinations, with a variety of trees, shrubs, bulbs, herbaceous perennials, annuals, and ornamental grasses for shade & sun, and moist & dry conditions. Its smaller scale, similar to residential gardens, is a place of ideas for home gardeners and garden designers.
 The Lawn Garden —  2 terraces of grassy greensward bordered by over 350 species and varieties of ornamental trees and shrubs, underplanted with: sweeps of perennials including peonies, day lilies, & iris; and diverse ground covers. 
 The Secret Garden — an enclosed oval garden on the third and lowest terrace of the Lawn Garden, with twin pergolas, a garden pool and fountain, a wide variety of ornamental grasses, annual plants, and tender and low maintenance perennial plants.
 The Inner Park — a native plant garden and mixed hardwood trees woodland, with pathways and Classical Revival style architectural elements, including the Peace Temple, a garden folly, the Pope Urn, and statuary.
 Pliny's Allée — a landscape allée of oak trees, underplanted with shrubs of notable autumn beauty, and two busts of Janus, the Roman deity of beginnings and endings. Pliny's Fountain, an antique stone wellhead that periodically erupts a jet of water is at the allée's terminus.
 The Vegetable Garden — a seasonal vegetable garden containing unusual and heirloom vegetables, herbs, and annual flowers.
 The Systematic Garden — a one-of-a-kind botany educational experience designed in an Italian Renaissance garden style, with plants arranged 'systematically' according to current taxonomy understandings of their evolutionary relationships. This garden displays plant species in 26 distinct plant families as a visual encyclopedia of the Plant Kingdom.
Both native plant and exotic species are incorporated into this wildlife garden. The Bird House is a screened building for visitors to enjoy bird watching without the bother of mosquitoes and other flying insects. Cross-country skiers are welcome here in winter.
 The Wildlife Refuge Pond — a  pond with wetlands that provides drinking water and habitat to wild birds, native amphibians, and indigenous species of fish. The Rustic style Viewing Pavilion is a vantage point for wildlife viewing.
 The Moss Steps —   a carpet of moss that grew to cover the Castalia stone steps underneath, located in the Edward Mezitt Shade Garden. The limestone rocks are from farm fields in Sandusky County, Ohio.  The area framing the steps has been planted with Mountain Laurel (Kalmia latifolia), and native ferns and wildflowers.
 The Court: A Garden Within Reach — a universally accessible garden space for all, with plantings chosen for their multi-sensory appeal. It has innovative moveable planters, more accessible raised beds, and a vertical green wall.
 The Field of Daffodils  —  a field of more than 25,000 daffodil bulbs creating a tapestry of color. It comes into bloom in late April, with the bloom period 'usually' peaking between the 3rd week of April and the 1st week of May.

Notable Collections 

 The Harrington Apple Orchard displays the Davenport Collection of heirloom apples, with 238 apple trees representing 119 pre-20th century heritage apple varieties.

Cary Award
The Cary Award program promotes outstanding plants for New England gardens. It is a collaborative effort of New England Botanic Garden at Tower Hill−Worcester County Horticultural Society, the Massachusetts Horticultural Society, the New England Nursery Association, and the Massachusetts Nursery and Landscape Association.  it highlights home landscape ornamental plants that have proven their performance in New England.

See also 
 
 List of botanical gardens in the United States

References

External links

Cary Award website

Botanical gardens in Massachusetts
Parks in Worcester County, Massachusetts
Libraries in Worcester County, Massachusetts
Tourist attractions in Worcester County, Massachusetts
1986 establishments in Massachusetts
Protected areas established in 1986
Woodland gardens